Ben-Ami (means "Son of my People") is a given name and surname. Notable people with the name include:

Given name:
 Ben Ammi Ben-Israel, founder of The African Hebrew Israelites of Jerusalem
 Ben-Ami Kadish (born 1924), U.S. Army mechanical engineer

Surname:
 Daniel Ben-Ami, British journalist
 Doron Ben-Ami, Israeli archaeologist
 Didi Benami (born 1986), American singer/songwriter
 Jacob Ben-Ami (1890–1977), Russian-born stage actor
 Jeremy Ben-Ami, chairman of U.S. Israel advocacy group J Street
 Joseph Ben-Ami, head of the Canadian Centre for Policy Studies 
 Moshe Ben-Ami (1898–1960), an Israeli politician and lawyer
 Naomi Ben-Ami (born 1960), Israeli diplomat and head of Nativ
 Shlomo Ben-Ami (born 1943), Israeli diplomat, politician and historian

See also 
 Ammon

Jewish given names
Hebrew masculine given names
Hebrew-language surnames